Şiləvəngə (also, Şiläväng) is a village and municipality in the Yardymli Rayon of Azerbaijan.  It has a population of 388.

References 

Populated places in Yardimli District